Columbia Union School District is a public school district based in Tuolumne County, California, which serves 500 students in grades K–8.

References

External links
 

School districts in California